S . C . Datta was an Indian politician and a member of the Tripura Legislative Assembly from Khowai Assembly constituency in 1967 election.

References 

Tripura politician stubs
Indian politicians
Tripura Legislative Assembly